APUS stands for "Amiga Power Up System", and describes a computer comprising an Amiga computer with a Phase5 PowerUP PowerPC accelerator board.

See also

References 

Amiga